The 2018 Ballon d'Or was the 63rd annual award ceremony recognising the best footballer in the world for 2018. The winners were announced on 3 December 2018, and for the first time in its history, the Ballon d'Or Féminin and Kopa Trophy were awarded to the best female footballer and male under-21 footballer, respectively. Luka Modrić, who was integral to Croatia's surprise journey to the 2018 FIFA World Cup Final, was awarded the Ballon d'Or. His win meant that it was the first time since Kaká in 2007 that a player other than Lionel Messi and Cristiano Ronaldo won the award, ending the 10-year Messi–Ronaldo dominance.

Ballon d'Or
The nominees for the awards were announced on 9 October 2018.

Ballon d'Or Féminin

Kopa Trophy

References 

2018
2018 in association football
2018 sports awards